The following is a list of FCC-licensed radio stations in the U.S. state of Oklahoma, which can be sorted by their call signs, frequencies, cities of license, licensees, and programming formats.

List of radio stations

Defunct
 KAMG-LP
 KEIF-LP
 KHVJ-LP
 KIOP
 KJRM-LP
 KJZT-LP
 KLGB-LP
 KMAC
 KNFB
 KONZ
 KPOP-LP
 KPSU
 KVWO-LP
 KZPY-LP

See also
 Oklahoma media
 List of newspapers in Oklahoma
 List of television stations in Oklahoma
 Media of locales in Oklahoma: Broken Arrow, Lawton, Norman, Oklahoma City, Tulsa

References

Bibliography
  
  
 Gene Allen. Voices On the Wind: Early Radio in Oklahoma (Oklahoma City: Oklahoma Heritage Association, 1993).

External links

 
  (Directory ceased in 2017)
 Oklahoma Association of Broadcasters
 Oklahoma Vintage Radio Club

Images

 
Oklahoma